Graffenrieda grandifolia is a species of plant in the family Melastomataceae. It is endemic to Colombia.

References

grandifolia
Endemic flora of Colombia
Near threatened plants
Taxonomy articles created by Polbot